The secretary of war was a member of the U.S. president's Cabinet, beginning with George Washington's administration. A similar position, called either "Secretary at War" or "Secretary of War", had been appointed to serve the Congress of the Confederation under the Articles of Confederation between 1781 and 1789. Benjamin Lincoln and later Henry Knox held the position. When Washington was inaugurated as the first President under the Constitution, he appointed Knox to continue serving as Secretary of War.

The secretary of war was the head of the War Department. At first, he was responsible for all military affairs, including naval affairs. In 1798, the secretary of the Navy was created by statute, and the scope of responsibility for this office was reduced to the affairs of the United States Army.  From 1886 onward, the secretary of war was in the line of succession to the presidency, after the vice president of the United States, the Speaker of the House of Representatives, the President pro tempore of the Senate and the secretary of state.

In 1947, with the passing of the National Security Act of 1947, the secretary of war was replaced by the secretary of the Army and the secretary of the Air Force, which, along with the secretary of the Navy, have since 1949 been non-Cabinet subordinates under the secretary of defense. The secretary of the Army's office is generally considered the direct successor to the secretary of war's office although the secretary of defense took the secretary of war's position in the Cabinet, and the line of succession to the presidency.

List of secretaries

Secretary at War (1781–1789)
The office of Secretary at War was modelled upon Great Britain's secretary at war, who was William Barrington, 2nd Viscount Barrington, at the time of the American Revolution. The office of Secretary at War was meant to replace both the commander-in-chief and the Board of War, and like the president of the board, the secretary wore no special insignia. The inspector general, quartermaster general, commissary general, and adjutant general served on the secretary's staff. However, the Army itself under Secretary Henry Knox only consisted of 700 men.

Secretary of War (1789–1947)
 
 Parties
 (4)
 (8)
 (14)
 (5)
 (25)

|-

|-

See also
 Confederate States Secretary of War

References

Footnotes

Further reading

Secretary of War
War
War
1789 establishments in the United States
1947 disestablishments in the United States